Mohler is an unincorporated community in Tillamook County, Oregon, United States. It is east of U.S. Route 101 on Oregon Route 53 along the Nehalem River.

It was named after A. L. Mohler, who was once president of the Union Pacific Railroad. The first post office in the area was established in 1897 and named "Balm". It was along Foley Creek about two miles southeast of present-day Mohler. In 1911 the name was changed to Mohler at the request of E. E. Lytle, who built the Pacific Railway and Navigation Company line into that part of the county. The post office was moved to the present locale of Mohler at the same time as the name change and operated there until 1959.

References

Unincorporated communities in Tillamook County, Oregon
1897 establishments in Oregon
Populated places established in 1897
Unincorporated communities in Oregon